Ustadi Ustad Se is a 1982 Indian Hindi-language film directed by Deepak Bahry, starring Mithun Chakraborty, Vinod Mehra, Ranjeeta in lead roles.

Summary

Young Seema (Sweety) with her grandfather and maternal uncle Kaamdev lives a middle-classed lifestyle. As a child, Raju (Rajesh) is her best friend and Sonu (Sanjay) also wants to be her friend, but she hates him. One day a stormy hurricane occurs and the entire city is destroyed. All three friends get separated from each other.

Cast

Mithun Chakraborty as Rajesh "Raju"
Vinod Mehra as Sanjay "Sonu"
Ranjeeta as Seema "Sweety" 
Prema Narayan as  Prema 
Bharat Kapoor as Prem
Padma Khanna as Kara 
Jagdeep as Kaamdev
Madhu Malhotra as Sheeba 
Trilok Kapoor as Police Inspector
Master Bhagwan as  Qawwali Dancer
Yunus Parvez as Goon
M. B. Shetty as Prem's Henchman
Bob Christo as Prem's Henchman
Jayshree T. as Jayshree (Bollywood Actress)
Birbal as Namdev (Kamdev's Nephew)
Ratnamala as Sanjay's Mother
Master Bittoo as Young Sanjay
Master Sonu Nigam as Young Rajesh
Gazala as Young Seema
Mumtaz Begum as Poor woman who is assisted by Rajesh

Music

References

External links
 

1982 films
1980s Hindi-language films
Films scored by Raamlaxman
Films directed by Deepak Bahry